Black spot disease is also known as diplopstomiasis or fluke disease. It is a freshwater fish disease caused by flatworm larvae of the genus Neascus. It appears as tiny black spots on the skin, fins and flesh of the fish.

The life cycle of the parasite typically involves a fish-eating bird, a snail and a fish. The black spot larvae grow to sexual maturity in the infected bird's intestine. The adult worms pass eggs with the bird's droppings. When the eggs reach water, they hatch into free-swimming organisms which then penetrate snails for further development. Finally, after leaving the snails they burrow into the skin of fish and form a cyst. The fish surrounds the cyst with black pigment that gives the disease its name. If an infected fish is consumed by a bird, the cycle repeats itself.

References

Parasitic helminths of fish
Fish diseases